Gracillaria loriolella is a moth of the family Gracillariidae. It is known from Norway, France, Switzerland, Austria, the Czech Republic, Poland, Hungary, Moldova, the European part of Russia, Ukraine, Tajikistan, Turkmenistan.

The larvae feed on Fraxinus species, including Fraxinus potamophila.

References

Gracillariinae
Moths of Europe
Moths described in 1881